Sa'aga Talu Teafa is a Tuvaluan civil servant, who has served as the country's first chief Ombudsman since October 2014.

Teafa was previously Permanent Secretary of the Ministry of Public Utilities.

In 2019 he criticised the government of New Zealand for discriminatory immigration requirements which prohibit disabled people from emigrating to New Zealand.

References

Living people
Tuvaluan civil servants
Ombudsmen
Year of birth missing (living people)